The Ross Hammock Site is a historic site nine miles south of New Smyrna Beach, Florida. It is located inland from the Intracoastal Waterway on A1A within the Canaveral National Seashore. On February 5, 1981, it was added to the U.S. National Register of Historic Places.

References

External links
 Volusia County listings at National Register of Historic Places
 Florida's Office of Cultural and Historical Programs
 Volusia County listings
 Ross Hammock Site

Native American history of Florida
Archaeological sites in Florida
National Register of Historic Places in Volusia County, Florida
Protected areas established in 1981